Chris McNutt (born 1986) is an American conservative activist and gun rights lobbyist who has made headlines for pushing "permitless carry"  legislation, also known as "Constitutional Carry". He is the president of Texas Gun Rights, a state affiliate of the National Association for Gun Rights.

Political career
During the 2018 primary elections, McNutt's group was accused of attacking then candidate for Texas State Senate Angela Paxton, wife of Texas Attorney General Ken Paxton, shortly after an affiliate of its parent organization received a $150,000 donation from the campaign account of Senator Don Huffines. Huffines' twin brother, Phil Huffines, was Paxton's opponent. Paxton defeated Huffines with 54.4% of the vote and went on to become the next state senator for Texas Senate, District 8.

McNutt's activism also extended to the city of Richardson in 2018, where he and his wife created the "Vote NO 4 RISD TRE PAC" to oppose the Richardson Independent School District's tax ratification election. The 12.5% property tax increase passed with 53% of the vote with record turnout.

McNutt appeared on the November 5, 2018, cover of Time magazine's "Guns in America" issue as the executive director for Texas Gun Rights.

Following the 2019 Texas legislative session, McNutt asked Governor Abbott to use his line-item veto to remove funding for a Department of Public Safety gun storage program. According to a statement from Texas Gun Rights, "Speaker Dennis Bonnen slipped a $1 million spending spree for the promotion of 'safe gun storage' into the states budget bill."

In 2020, McNutt testified to the Alabama Senate Judiciary Committee in favor of a bill to repeal the Alabama permit requirement for the concealed carrying of pistols. The bill ultimately stalled after failing to gain traction in the Republican-controlled legislature. McNutt and his Texas Gun Rights faced off with the National Rifle Association (NRA) in the 2020 primary election when TXGR-backed candidate Bryan Slaton forced NRA-backed incumbent Dan Flynn into a runoff. Slaton went on to defeat Flynn with over 61% of the vote.

In 2021, McNutt delivered over 118,000 petitions in support of "Constitutional Carry" to the Texas House of Representatives and testified in support of it during a hearing in the Texas House Homeland Security and Public Safety Committee. Texas GOP Chairman Lieutenant Colonel Allen West later partnered with McNutt and his organization to pressure Lieutenant Governor Dan Patrick and the Texas Senate to pass Constitutional Carry House Bill 1927. Abbott said he would sign the bill if it reached his desk. After the bill passed through both chambers of the legislature, McNutt claimed the Governor removed him from the signing ceremony before signing it into law.

Controversy with Texas Speaker of the House Dennis Bonnen
During the 2019 legislative session, Speaker of the Texas House of Representatives Dennis Bonnen accused McNutt of threatening behavior after McNutt, while leafleting Bonnen's neighborhood in support of permitless carry legislation, showed up at his home. Bonnen says that McNutt's actions were the reason he declared McNutt's bill dead.

Bonnen and McNutt had a confrontation at a subsequent Republican Party fundraiser dinner. McNutt demanded an apology from Bonnen and also claimed that he had lied about their interactions.

Texas Speaker Dennis Bonnen's Resignation
The controversy between Chris McNutt and Dennis Bonnen was credited as the reason Empower Texans president Michael Quinn Sullivan secretly recorded a meeting with Bonnen, which was described by Texas Monthly as "the most significant political scandal in Texas politics in many years". In the recording, Bonnen offered Empower Texans press credentials that would allow them on the floor of the Texas House during the 2021 legislative session. In exchange, Bonnen wanted Empower Texans to target certain Republican representatives in the next primary election for defeat while not criticizing certain other Republicans.  After Sullivan released a tape of the meeting, Bonnen announced he would not seek re-election.

"I recorded the meeting not to capture the “locker room” talk or gossip that is typical of meetings in the Austin swamp, but to ensure Bonnen could not lie about the meeting or distort its purpose in the future. I had in mind the lies he told (publicly and without any consequence so far) about Chris McNutt of Texas Gun Rights, and I have heard stories of him doing the same to others, so I wasn’t going to let him do it to me" Michael Quinn Sullivan stated when he released the recording in October 2019.

References

Living people
1986 births
Date of birth missing (living people)
Place of birth missing (living people)
American gun rights activists
University of North Texas at Dallas people
Texas Republicans
People from Richardson, Texas